Zeebrugge (from: Brugge aan zee  meaning "Bruges-on-Sea") is a village on the coast of Belgium and a subdivision of Bruges, for which it is the modern port. Zeebrugge serves as both the international port of Bruges-Zeebrugge and a seafront resort with hotels, cafés, a marina and a beach.

Location

Zeebrugge is located on the coast of the North Sea. Its central location on the Belgian coast, short distance to Great Britain and close vicinity to densely populated industrialised cities make it a crossroads for traffic from all directions. An expressway to Bruges connects Zeebrugge to the European motorway system; one can also get to and from Zeebrugge by train or tram. A 12 km canal links the port to the centre of Bruges.

It is Belgium's most important fishing port and the wholesale fish market located there is one of the largest in Europe.

Aside from being a passenger terminal with ferries to the United Kingdom, the harbour serves as the central port for Europe's automotive industry, and it is important for the import, handling and storage of energy products, agriculture products and other general cargo. Zeebrugge has the largest LNG terminal complex in Europe.

History

1918 Zeebrugge Raid

The harbour was the site of the Zeebrugge Raid on 23 April 1918, when the British Royal Navy temporarily put the German inland naval base at Bruges out of action. Admiral Roger Keyes planned and led the raid that stormed the German batteries and sank three old warships at the entrance to the canal leading to the inland port. This action was a partial success as it blocked the access, but the Germans dug a new canal around the ships. The raid, although a morale-boosting victory in Britain, was also claimed as a victory in Germany.

1987 ferry disaster

Later, in 1987, Zeebrugge's harbour was the scene of disaster when the MS Herald of Free Enterprise passenger ferry capsized, having set sail with her bow doors open, killing 193 people.

Passenger ferry routes
P&O Ferries to Hull, United Kingdom
a succession of former services to Rosyth, United Kingdom

See also
West Flanders
Zeebrugge Hub

References

External links

Brugge.be 
Kitelinks.be, live weather in zeebrugge
 

 
Populated places in West Flanders
Port cities and towns in Belgium
Port cities and towns of the North Sea
Geography of Bruges